The lesser tubercle of the humerus, although smaller, is more prominent than the greater tubercle: it is situated in front, and is directed medially and anteriorly.

The projection of the lesser tubercle is anterior from the junction that is found between the anatomical neck and the shaft of the humerus and easily identified due to the intertubercular sulcus (Bicipital groove).

Above and in front it presents an impression for the insertion of the tendon of the subscapularis.

Additional images

References

External links
 
 
 
 Diagram at uwlax.edu

Bones of the upper limb
Humerus